Louis Williams may refer to:

Sports
Louis Williams (American football) (born 1979), American football player
Louis Williams (footballer) (1889–?), English football (soccer) player
Lou Williams (born 1986), American basketball player

Others
Louis Williams (sailor) (1845–1886), American sailor
Louis Williams (architect) (1890–1980), Australian architect
Louis L. Williams, director of the Centers for Disease Control and Prevention
Louis Otho Williams (1908–1991), American botanist
Pete Williams (journalist) (Louis Alan Williams, born 1952), American television correspondent

See also
Lewis Williams (disambiguation)